John Sibson (16 January 1930 – 11 December 2014) was an Australian politician who was a Liberal Party member of the Legislative Assembly of Western Australia from 1973 to 1983, representing the seat of Bunbury.

Sibson was born in Perth, but raised on his parents' farm in Cowaramup, a country town in the South West. After leaving school he worked variously as a milk vendor, a transport contractor, a school-bus driver, and a car salesman. A long-time member of the Liberal Party, Sibson entered parliament at the 1973 Bunbury by-election, which had been caused by the resignation of the sitting Liberal member, Maurice Williams. He held the seat until being defeated by Labor's Phil Smith at the 1983 state election. After being defeated, Sibson was elected to the City of Bunbury council, serving a three-year term. He attempted to re-enter parliament at the 1986 state election, but was unsuccessful, suffering a further swing against him.

References

1930 births
2014 deaths
Liberal Party of Australia members of the Parliament of Western Australia
Members of the Western Australian Legislative Assembly
Politicians from Perth, Western Australia
Western Australian local councillors